Kyjatice is a village and municipality in the Rimavská Sobota District of the Banská Bystrica Region of southern Slovakia. Near the village there is archeological park with more than 2000 years old excavations. Protestant church in the village contains Gothic paint wall from 14th century, painted wooden Renaissance ceiling from 1637 and Renaissance altar from 1678.

External links
 
Artistic photo of Kyjatice church
http://www.e-obce.sk/obec/kyjatice/4-kulturne_dedicstvo.html

Villages and municipalities in Rimavská Sobota District